Courtois Creek is a  stream in southern Missouri, United States. It shares its name with the nearby town of Courtois and is in the Courtois Hills region of the Missouri Ozarks. According to the information in the Ramsay Place Names File at the University of Missouri, the creek was "doubtless named for some French settler, but his identity has not been ascertained".

The stream arises in the Mark Twain National Forest in northern Iron County, just north of Missouri Route 32 about four miles east of Bixby, and flows northward, passing about four miles east of Viburnum. The stream enters the southwest corner of Washington County, flows past Courtois and on north through the Mark Twain National Forest, entering Crawford County just south of Berryman and passing under Missouri Route 8 just west of that village.  It flows on northwest through the Missouri Ozarks of Crawford County, roughly paralleling the course of Huzzah Creek to its west. It flows into Huzzah Creek just before the latter's confluence with the Meramec River, near the Crawford County Highway E bridge just east of Scotia.

The creek is popular year-round for canoeing, kayaking, and rafting. It is surrounded by dense stands of trees and native vegetation, has abundant fish, turtles and waterfowl, and is the best-protected stream in the area against erosion. The St. Louis Riverfront Times cited the creek as the best local float trip in 2007.

Variant names
According to the Geographic Names Information System, it has also been known historically as:
Coataway Creek
Cotoway Creek
Courtoi Creek
Fourch Courtois Creek
Huzza Creek

References

External links

 Southwest Paddler: Courtois Creek
 Missouri Canoe and Floater's Association: Huzzah Creek & Courtois Creek

Rivers of Missouri
Rivers of Iron County, Missouri
Rivers of Crawford County, Missouri
Rivers of Washington County, Missouri
Tributaries of the Meramec River